Lois Hole Centennial Provincial Park is a provincial park and part of a designated Important Bird Area in Alberta, Canada, located immediately west from Edmonton and St. Albert. It was named after Lois Hole, former Lieutenant Governor of Alberta.

It is maintained by Alberta Tourism, Parks and Recreation and was established on April 19, 2005, on lands designated in 1999 as Big Lake Natural Area (part of the Special Places program). It is the most recent provincial park to be established in the province, and Alberta's 69th in total.

Activities
Birdwatching is a popular activity in the park: Species include Franklin's gull, tundra swan, black tern, eared grebe, northern pintail, yellowlegs, dowitcher, pectoral sandpiper, American avocet and other sandpipers. A total of 223 bird species have been observed in the area.

See also
List of provincial parks in Alberta
List of Canadian provincial parks
List of National Parks of Canada

References

External links

Provincial parks of Alberta
Sturgeon County
2005 establishments in Alberta
Protected areas established in 2005